Lingzhi may refer to:
 Lingzhi mushroom (Ganoderma lingzhi), also called reishi, or several other similar mushrooms of the genus Ganoderma including:
  Ganoderma lucidum
 Ganoderma tsugae
 Lingzhi Gewog, a village block (gewog) of Thimphu District, Bhutan
 Lingzhi Yügyal Dzong, a monastery and fortress in Bhutan
 Lingzhi, Shaoxing (灵芝镇), town in Yuecheng District, Shaoxing, Zhejiang, China

th:เห็ดหลินจือ